Choice of a New Generation is the second album by the punk rock band Fifteen. It was released in 1992 through Lookout! Records. It is similar to the band's debut album, as it features long punk songs that deal with love and social commentary.

It is the only Fifteen album to feature Lucky Dog on bass and backing vocals.

Track listing

Personnel 
 Jeff Ott – lead vocals, guitar
 Lucky Dog – bass, backing vocals
 Mark Moreno – drums, backing vocals

Production
 Andy Ernst– producer
 John Golden – mastering

References

1992 albums
Fifteen (band) albums